Karen Denise Pickering, MBE (born 19 December 1971) is a former freestyle swimmer from Great Britain.

Swimming career
She made her international senior debut in 1986. She was first selected to represent her country at the European Junior Championships. Pickering competed in four consecutive Summer Olympics, starting in 1992.

She won her first medal in 1993, at the inaugural 1993 FINA Short Course World Championships in Palma de Mallorca, where she won the gold medal in the 200 m freestyle. With that performance Pickering became Britain's first swimming world champion.

She was a member of the British swimming squad from 1986 to 2005 and has a collection that includes 8 World Championship medals (4 gold), 14 European Championship medals, 38 National Championship titles, and a Commonwealth Games medal haul of 13 including 4 gold. The 2002 Commonwealth Games saw Karen win three medals, two gold and one silver, in front of her home crowd, a career highlight which was crowned with the honour of carrying the English flag at the closing ceremony.

She is a two times winner of the British Championship in the 50 metres freestyle (1992 and 1993), seven times winner of the 100 metres freestyle (1989-1993, 1997, 2000), nine times winner of the 200 metres freestyle (1990, 1992–1995, 1997, 1999 and 2002–2003) and was the 400 metres freestyle champion in 1992, 2002 and 2003.

Honours
For her services to swimming Karen was awarded an MBE in the 1994 New Years Honours List.

Pickering is  the Sports Ambassador for Ipswich in Suffolk, and chaired the British Athletes Commission between 2004 and 2016.

See also
 List of World Aquatics Championships medalists in swimming (women)
 List of Commonwealth Games medallists in swimming (women)
 World record progression 4 × 200 metres freestyle relay

References

External links

1971 births
Living people
English female swimmers
Sportspeople from Brighton
Sportspeople from Ipswich
Olympic swimmers of Great Britain
Swimmers at the 1992 Summer Olympics
Swimmers at the 1996 Summer Olympics
Swimmers at the 2000 Summer Olympics
Swimmers at the 2004 Summer Olympics
Commonwealth Games gold medallists for England
Commonwealth Games silver medallists for England
Commonwealth Games bronze medallists for England
Swimmers at the 1990 Commonwealth Games
Swimmers at the 1994 Commonwealth Games
Swimmers at the 1998 Commonwealth Games
Swimmers at the 2002 Commonwealth Games
British female freestyle swimmers
World Aquatics Championships medalists in swimming
Medalists at the FINA World Swimming Championships (25 m)
European Aquatics Championships medalists in swimming
Commonwealth Games medallists in swimming
Members of the Order of the British Empire
Medallists at the 1990 Commonwealth Games
Medallists at the 1994 Commonwealth Games
Medallists at the 1998 Commonwealth Games
Medallists at the 2002 Commonwealth Games